The 1977 Villanova Wildcats football team represented Villanova University in the 1977 NCAA Division I football season. It was head coach Dick Bedesem's third season with the team. They played their home games at Villanova Stadium in Villanova, Pennsylvania.

Schedule

References

Villanova
Villanova Wildcats football seasons
Villanova Wildcats football